St. Brendan's College may refer to:

 St. Brendan's College, Killarney in County Kerry, Ireland
 St. Brendan's College, Yeppoon in Queensland, Australia 
 St. Brendan's Sixth Form College in Bristol, England
 St Brendan-Shaw College in Devonport, Tasmania, Australia

See also
 St. Brendan's (disambiguation), for similarly named schools